The 1996 International Formula 3000 Championship was contested over ten rounds from 11 May to 12 October 1996.  This was the first F3000 season in which every team had the same chassis, engine and tyres.

Drivers and constructors

Calendar

Final points standings

Drivers' Championship

Notes
All drivers used Lola T96/50 chassis, with Zytek-Judd engines, and Avon tyres.
Kenny Bräck was disqualified from first place from the second race at Hockenheim for dangerous driving.
Laurent Redon was disqualified from the race at Estoril due to taking the wrong position on the grid.
Thomas Biagi was disqualified from the first race at Hockenheim for ignoring a drive-through penalty.

Complete Overview

R22=retired, but classified R=retired NC=not classified NS=did not start NQ=did not qualify DIS(1)=disqualified after finishing as winner 17E=grid position, but started from the end of the grid

References 

 
 

International Formula 3000
International Formula 3000 seasons
Formula 3000